Borj-e Sefid is a building located in Pasdaran, in Tehran, Iran.
The Borj-e Sefid (which translates to "White Tower" in English) is a high-rise building built along Pasdaran Ave, within which is contained a shopping center as well as many offices. The building has cemented Pasdaran's status as an upscale suburb of Tehran, raising the area's profile and spurring a series of developments in the surrounding areas. It is home to the revolving restaurant of Borj-e Sefid at the top floor of the building.

Although the building is a center of business and commerce and is part of a trend towards increasing urbanity in the district (mainly witnessed along the district's northern edge near Farmaniye), the majority of the area's housing remains relatively suburban in nature, consisting mostly of mansions and townhomes or duplexes.

See also
 List of revolving restaurants
 List of towers
 List of tallest structures in Iran

External links
About Borj Sefid, Hotel Borj Sefid

Buildings and structures in Tehran
Buildings and structures with revolving restaurants